Phyllidia flava is a species of sea slug, a dorid nudibranch, a marine gastropod mollusk in the family Phyllidiidae.

Distribution
This species is the only Phyllidiid known to be native to the Mediterranean Sea.

References

External links
 

Phyllidiidae
Gastropods described in 1847